Beck – Pensionat Pärlan (English: Beck – The Boarding House Pearl) is a 1997 Swedish police film about Martin Beck, directed by Kjell Sundvall.

Cast 
 Peter Haber as Martin Beck
 Mikael Persbrandt as Gunvald Larsson
 Stina Rautelin as Lena Klingström
 Per Morberg as Joakim Wersén
 Rebecka Hemse as Inger (Martin Beck's daughter)
 Michael Nyqvist as John Banck
 Anna Ulrica Ericsson as Yvonne Jäder
 Peter Hüttner as Oljelund
 Lennart Hjulström as Gavling
 Lasse Lindroth as Peter

References

External links 

1997 crime films
1997 television films
1997 films
Films directed by Kjell Sundvall
Martin Beck films
1990s Swedish-language films
1990s police procedural films
1990s Swedish films